The Pšata (in older sources also Pešata) is a river of Slovenia. It is a right tributary of the Kamnik Bistrica, which merges with the Sava east of Ljubljana, the capital of Slovenia.

References

External links
 Condition of the Pšata graphs, in the following order, of water level, flow, and temperature data for the past 30 days (taken in Topole by ARSO)

Rivers of Upper Carniola